I'll Cry Tomorrow is a 1954 autobiography by Lillian Roth, co-written by Roth, Gerold Frank and journalist Mike Connolly. It is a "brutally frank" depiction of Roth's alcoholism, one of the earlier books by a celebrity on addiction, and influential in drawing attention to alcoholism as a disease. It sold over 7 million copies in 20 languages. It was adapted into the 1955 film of the same name.

References 

1954 non-fiction books
American autobiographies
Alcoholics Anonymous
Memoirs about alcoholism
English-language books